Taoyuan may refer to:

Mainland China
 Taoyuan County (桃源县), county of Changde, Hunan
 Taoyuan Subdistrict (disambiguation)
Towns
Written as "桃園镇":
 Taoyuan, Rugao, Jiangsu
 Taoyuan, Xuzhou, in Suining County, Jiangsu
 Taoyuan, Feicheng, Shandong 

Written as "桃源镇":
 Taoyuan, Fujian, in Datian County
 Taoyuan, Dabu County, Guangdong
 Taoyuan, Jiangmen, in Heshan, Guangdong
 Taoyuan, Suzhou, in Wujiang, Jiangsu

Taiwan
 Taoyuan, Taiwan (桃園市), special municipality, formerly known as Taoyuan County (桃園縣)
 Taoyuan District (桃園區), urban district of Taoyuan City, formerly itself known as Taoyuan City
 Taoyuan District, Kaohsiung (桃源區), rural district of Kaohsiung City
 Taoyuan International Airport , the main international airport in Taiwan

See also
 Taoyuan Air Base, a former Republic of China Air Force base
 Tao Yuan (disambiguation)
 Taiyuan, capital and largest city of Shanxi province in North China